is a Japanese manga series written by Ikki Kajiwara and illustrated by Naoki Tsuji. The series was first published in  Kodansha's Bokura Magazine from 1968 to 1970 and was later published in Weekly Shōnen Magazine from 1970 to 1971. It was later adapted into an anime series by Toei Animation which first aired on Yomiuri TV or TV Asahi on October 2, 1969 and ended its run on September 30, 1971, airing 105 episodes. In real life, the name has been used by a succession of Japanese professional wrestling characters as a gimmick. The Tiger Mask persona is instantly recognizable by its trademark mask, designed to look like a tiger's head, as well as the combination of high flying attacks and martial arts in the ring.

Plot 
Tiger Mask, whose real name was Naoto Date, was a feared heel wrestler in America who was extremely vicious in the ring. However, he became a face after returning to Japan when a young boy said that he wanted to be a villain like Tiger Mask when he grew up. The boy resided in an orphanage, the same one that Tiger Mask grew up in during his childhood. Feeling that he did not want the boy to idolize a villain, Tiger was inspired to be a heroic wrestler.

The main antagonist in the manga and anime was the Tiger's Den, a mysterious organization that trained young people to be villainous wrestlers on the condition that they gave half of their earnings to the organization. Tiger Mask was once a member of the Tiger's Den under the name "Yellow Devil", but no longer wanted anything to do with them, instead donating his money to the orphanage. This infuriated the leader of the organization and he sent numerous assassins, including other professional wrestlers, to punish him.

In , a new opponent called "Outer Space Mask" bullies his way into the ring without representing any wrestling federation. Tatsuo Aku, once an orphan child from the "house of the children", was a fan of Naoto, who has died. He would put on his old hero's mask to become the new Tiger Mask.

Characters

Tiger Mask and his comrades 
 / 
 Voiced by: Kei Tomiyama, Katsuji Mori (ep. 32~39)

 / 
 Voiced by: Ryouichi Tanaka

 / 
 Voiced by: Kazuya Tatekabe

 Voiced by: Yonehiko Kitagawa

 Voiced by: Shingo Kanemoto

Chibikko House 

 Voiced by: Kenji Nakagawa

 Voiced by: Nana Yamaguchi (ep. 1~77), Michiko Nomura (ep. 78~105)

 Voiced by: Masako Nozawa

 Voiced by: Masako Taki (ep. 1~55), Noriko Watanabe (ep. 56~105)

 Voiced by: Sachiko Chijimatsu

 Voiced by: Keiko Yamamoto

 Voiced by: Kazuko Sugiyama

 Voiced by: Reiko Katsura

Tiger's Den 

 Voiced by: Hidekatsu Shibata
Mister X is the main antagonist of the series.

 /  / 
 Voiced by: Taimei Suzuki
The Boss is the leader of the Tiger's Den. He makes his first appearance disguised as the unbelievably strong fighter Miracle 3, the only fighter with total supremacy in the three fundamental abilities: strength, speed and illegal moves. Miracle 3 wins every fight in a clear and correct way, studying Tiger Mask's style against some fighters chosen by him. When he finally fights with Tiger Mask, he reassumes his old name: Tiger the Great.

 Voiced by: Yonehiko Kitagawa

 Voiced by: Kenji Nakagawa

 Voiced by: Masao Nakasone
The third master of the Tiger's Den. He was considered the strongest fighter ever. He was forced to retire because nobody was capable to fight him on an even basis. Adding to his considerable technique, King Tiger is the absolute master of illegal moves. His fight with Tiger Mask rapidly escalates to a real bloodbath.

Other characters 
TV announcer
 Voiced by: Keiichi Noda
Ring announcer and narrator.

Tiger Mask II characters

Publication history 
The manga was originally created for the Bokura Magazine in 1968 by Ikki Kajiwara and Naoki Tsuji. The manga would be reprinted by Kodansha comics, and made available in Hong Kong. Further versions include Sankei Comics and the Kodansha KC Special. The anime would be televised nationally in Japan, while two movies would be constructed from reusing footage of the series. Most of the environment and characters were fictional, but real-life pro wrestlers like Antonio Inoki, Giant Baba, Michiaki Yoshimura, Kintaro Ohki and Seiji Sakaguchi were included in the manga and anime as well.

On March 3, 2016, New Japan Pro-Wrestling announced the revival of the Tiger Mask anime series. The series, entitled Tiger Mask W, premiered on TV Asahi in October 2016. It is also currently streaming on Crunchyroll, marking it as the first Tiger Mask anime available to American viewers. This new series is the exclusive sequel of the anime version and completely ignores Tiger Mask II, which confirms Naoto Date's death like in the manga. In fact, his death isn't confirmed.

Adaptations

Films 
The movies were titled as such in English when exported outside Japan. They are not actual translations.

Video games 
While the Tiger Mask character has appeared in a number of wrestling video games, such as Fire Pro Wrestling D, Toukon Retsuden 3, Sunday vs Magazine: Shūketsu! Chōjō Daikessen and Virtual Pro Wrestling 64, the games are not directly based on the story of the manga or anime.

Cultural influences 

In the early 1980s, the bookers in the New Japan Pro-Wrestling promotion licensed the character and created a real-life Tiger Mask, originally portrayed by Satoru Sayama, to help boost their junior heavyweight division.

In 2010 and 2011, several people in Japan donated to children's homes and other social welfare centers by using the name "Naoto Date" as an alias.

In 2012 an Israeli artist named Omer Rabinovitz recorded a fictional song over the series opening sequence renaming it 'Namer HaKesef' ("The Silver/Money Leopard"), reaching over 400 thousand views on Youtube and becoming a cult phenomenon in Israel. Fictional episodes created independently by the community, and a Minecraft skin was also created.

In Ben 10 Alien Force, Rath is a tiger-like alien who uses wrestling moves on his foes. Similarly, both characters were also vicious at first but then turned good after meeting a small child.

In video games 
In the Tekken video game series, a character named King shares similarities with Tiger Mask, except his mask is that of a jaguar rather than a tiger.

Street Fighter II, in its early concept design stages, had a very similar homage to Tiger Mask in its character roster.

In the video game series Hotline Miami, there is a tiger mask that when equipped, allows you throw devastating punches when unarmed. This may be a reference to Tiger Mask.

In the Yo-Kai Watch game series, a yokai named Machonyan wears a tiger mask.

Pokémon Sun and Moon introduced Incineroar, the "Heel Pokémon," displaying elements of both a tiger and a wrestler. It is also a playable character in Super Smash Bros. Ultimate.

References

External links 

 
 Tiger Mask movie Japanese

1968 manga
1969 anime television series debuts
1971 Japanese television series endings
1981 anime television series debuts
1982 Japanese television series endings
Ikki Kajiwara
Kodansha manga
Manga adapted into films
Martial arts anime and manga
Professional wrestling comics
Shōnen manga
Shunsuke Kikuchi
Toei Animation television
TV Asahi original programming
Wrestling in anime and manga
Yomiuri Telecasting Corporation original programming
Television series about tigers
Gekiga
Japanese sports drama films
Fictional tigers